The wind band has been known as the City of Sydney Youth Concert Band, City of Sydney Bicentennial Concert Band, The City of Sydney Concert Band, City of Sydney Wind Ensemble and is now known as Sydney Wind Symphony, one of the leading amateur wind ensembles in the Sydney metropolitan region.

History 
In 1984, Victor Grieve approached the Sydney City Council with a view to forming a Youth Band to celebrate the International Year of Youth, under the patronage and sponsorship of the City Council. The City of Sydney Youth Concert Band was formed in February of that year, 65 players being selected from the Sydney Metropolitan area. During 1984 the band performed with great distinction performing at the Sydney Town Hall and the Sydney Opera House. With the support of the Sydney Council it was agreed that the band should continue on at the end of International Year of Youth as the "City of Sydney Bicentennial Concert Band". New auditions were held, and from 350 applicants, 70 players were selected. The group have given many concerts, including Sydney Town Hall, the Sydney Opera House, Darling Harbour and all over the state of New South Wales. The objectives or aim of the band were to give public performances in the months leading up to and during Bicentennial Year (1988). The band was proud to visit the sister city of Portsmouth, England in 1987 and to take part in the British Celebrations commemorating the sailing of the First Fleet to Australia in 1787 and performed with distinction in the presence of Her Majesty the Queen and the Duke of Edinburgh, as part of a hectic two week tour of the United Kingdom and France. The Band also travelled to sister city San Francisco (USA), Calgary (Canada) and Nagoya (Japan).

From 1989 the ensemble, described in 1992 as "the musical voice of our city" by Alderman Frank Sartor, Lord Mayor of Sydney, was known as The City of Sydney Concert Band and represented the city at a number of civic functions, including the Lord Mayor's charity concert, the arrival and departure of the Queen Elizabeth 2, the arrival of Her Majesty Queen Elizabeth II and Prince Philip, Duke of Edinburgh at Sydney Town Hall and the 60th Anniversary of the Sydney Harbour Bridge. In 1992 it undertook a three-week European tour which included an appearance at World Expo '92 in Seville.

In 1999, the concert band changed its name to the City of Sydney Wind Ensemble and continued, this time, without the sponsorship of the Council of the City of Sydney. Since 2008 the ensemble has been known as Sydney Wind Symphony.

Competitions 
Sydney Wind Symphony has competed regularly in the A Grade Open Concert Band Competition and was declared National Champion in 2000   and 2004, New South Wales State Champion in 2003 and 2005 and was placed second in both the National and State competitions in 2009.

Notable performances 
Performances of note include:
 World Expo '92 Seville
 Australia National Day celebrations in 1992
 Visit of Her Majesty Queen Elizabeth II and Prince Philip, Duke of Edinburgh
 Host City announcement for the 2000 Olympic Games
 Centenary of Federation Parade
 Lord Mayor's Charity Concert
 60th Anniversary of the Sydney Harbour Bridge
 Various Australia Day Celebrations, World Cup ticket matches and many more.

Concert tours 
 UK & France, 1987
 Japan
 Canada
 USA
 Nagoya, Japan, 1990
 Ayers Rock, Northern Territory, Australia, 1991
 Europe, 1992
 Eastern Europe, 1997

Musical directors 
 Victor Grieve, City of Sydney Youth Concert Band
 Victor Grieve, City of Sydney Bicentennial Band
 Harold Pollard, Assistant Conductor, City of Sydney Bicentennial Band
 Michael Butcher, City of Sydney Concert Band, 1989–1999
 John Buckley, The City of Sydney Wind Ensemble, 2000
 Steve Hillinger, The City of Sydney Wind Ensemble, 2001–2006
 John Buckley, Sydney Wind Symphony, 2007–2012
 Lloyd Edge, Sydney Wind Symphony, (Guest Musical Director) 2012
 Mark Brown, Sydney Wind Symphony, (Guest Musical Director) 2012
 Mark Brown, Sydney Wind Symphony, 2013–present

References

External links 
 City of Sydney Youth Festival Concert Band  Concert Advertisement, The Sydney Morning Herald, 28 April 1985
 Sydney Wind Symphony, Mosman Council Photograph 26 October 2008
 Sydney Wind Symphony Official Website
National Band Council of Australia, 2004 Results
Band Association of New South Wales, State Concert Championships 2010

Australian orchestras
Culture of Sydney